Nojirimycin is the parent compound of a class of antibiotics and glycosidase inhibitors. Nojirimycin and its derivatives are mainly obtained from a class of Streptomyces species. Chemically, it is an iminosugar.

Derivatives
 1-deoxynojirimycin or duvoglustat
 1-deoxygalactonojirimycin or migalastat, a drug for the treatment of Fabry disease

References

Antibiotics
Streptomyces
Iminosugars